Gonzalo Damián Abrego (born 7 January 2000) is an Argentine professional footballer who plays as a midfielder for Godoy Cruz Antonio Tomba.

Career
Abrego joined the academy of Godoy Cruz at the age of fourteen, following a short spell with Deportivo Maipú. Diego Martínez promoted the central midfielder into the first-team in 2020, as he initially appeared as an unused substitute for Copa de la Liga Profesional defeats to River Plate and Rosario Central in early November. Abrego made his senior debut on 28 November in that aforementioned competition against Banfield, featuring for the full duration of a goalless draw.

Career statistics
.

Notes

References

External links

2000 births
Living people
Sportspeople from Mendoza Province
Argentine footballers
Association football midfielders
Argentine Primera División players
Godoy Cruz Antonio Tomba footballers